SS Georgia was an oil tanker that was built in the United States in 1908 as Texas and spent most of her career in the United States Merchant Marine. In 1917 she was renamed Georgia. In 1927 she was transferred to Dutch ownership, and shortly thereafter ran aground and was lost on Haisborough Sands off the coast of Norfolk, England.

History
Newport News Shipbuilding and Drydock Company built the ship at Newport News, Virginia as hull number 82. She was launched as Texas on 24 April 1908 and delivered to her owners, The Texas Company (now Texaco) on 18 July 1908.

The Texas Company registered the ship at Port Arthur, Texas. Her US official number was 205362 and her code letters were KWQL.

By 1917 the ship had been renamed Georgia and was equipped for wireless telegraphy. By 1918 her call sign was KUR.

In February 1918 she was inspected for possible United States Navy service and assigned the Identification Number (ID) 2316. The Navy ordered her acquisition, but it was cancelled shortly before the Armistice of 11 November 1918, and she remained in commercial service.

In 1922 it was reported that the ship's name had been changed to Texaco.

By 1927 the NV Dutch Tanker & Oil Company Ltd owned her, and had registered her in Amsterdam. Her Dutch code letters were NTBH.

Final voyage
In September 1927 Georgia loaded a cargo of crude oil at Abadan in Persia (now Iran). She left the Persian Gulf bound for the oil refinery at Grangemouth, Scotland.

By 20 November she was in the North Sea when a strong gale broke her steering gear. Just before midnight she ran aground on Haisborough Sands and stuck fast. The storm carried away her radio aerial, so her wireless telegraphist was unable to send a distress signal. For several hours the heavy sea battered her hull, eventually ripping her apart amidships. Her after section was sounding her siren as a distress signal, but the two halves slowly drifted apart and lost sight of each other, the stern section being carried away by the force of the gale.

The bow section remained stuck on the sand bank with huge seas washing over it. The bow section had the captain, Harry Kissing and 14 of the crew all crouched in the forecastle. The other 16 members of the crew were in the drifting stern section. The next morning (21 November) the steamship Trent sighted the drifting stern section and rescued the 16 crewmen. Trent then found the bow section stuck on the sand bank. In the meantime, the stern section had drifted North West and was sighted off Cromer.

Henry Blogg, coxswain of the Cromer lifeboat , attending to the stern reported at 3.15 p.m. that the ship had been abandoned although at this time they were unaware that the ship was in two halves as the stern was creeping higher into the air. The Cromer lifeboat attended the stern section all that night warning shipping of the danger. Back at the bow section, the Great Yarmouth Coastguard had learned of the disaster at 9 p.m. and had called the Gorleston lifeboat to assist. Trent had signalled by wireless that it was too dangerous to approach the stern section, and she made for Cromer to land the rescued men from the stern section.

On the morning of 22 November the Gorleston lifeboat tried to rescue the remaining 15 crew, now sheltering in the chartroom, the highest point on the ship out of the water. Coxswain Billy Fleming tried to use the lee provided by the close by Trent, but with the seas still heavy this proved to be too dangerous, and she stood off to wait until conditions improved. Another attempt was made at midday. On the fifth attempt they got a line to the stranded section, but a huge wave picked up the lifeboat and dropped her in a trough, snapping the line. The Gorleston boat then developed engine trouble and retired from the rescue.

At about 4.30 pm the remaining crew were finally rescued by the exhausted crew of the Cromer lifeboat. Blogg and his crew had stood by the stern section all night, and then after returning to Cromer, were immediately called back out to attend the bow. H F Bailey was considerably damaged in the rescue, but got her crew and the rescued men safely back to Great Yarmouth by 7 pm. Both sections of Georgia sank in the following days.

Positions of the wrecks
Stern section
Bow section

References

Bibliography

External links
 
 
 The Old Cromer Lifeboat Shed

1908 ships
Maritime incidents in 1927
Merchant ships of the Netherlands
Oil tankers
Ships built in Newport News, Virginia
Shipwrecks of Norfolk
Shipwrecks in the North Sea
Steamships of the Netherlands
Steamships of the United States
World War I merchant ships of the United States